The USSR Premier Basketball League, or Soviet Union Premier Basketball League (also called Supreme League), was the first-tier men's professional basketball league in the former Soviet Union. The league existed from 1923 to 1991, as the top professional basketball league of the Soviet Union, and from 1991 to 1992, as the top professional basketball league of the CIS. In the years 1924, 1928, 1934, 1935, 1936, 1956, 1959, 1963, and 1967, the league was contested by regional teams, rather than individual sports clubs.

CSKA Moscow was the league's most successful club, having won the league's championship 24 times, including winning 9 consecutive championships, from 1976 to 1984. The league featured the players of the senior men's Soviet Union national basketball team. The league exists in a similar format today, as the VTB United League. Although, the VTB United League can include clubs from countries that were not a part of the Soviet Union.

USSR League history

 1923–24 to 1935–36  Soviet Union Regional League
 1936–37 to 1990–91  Soviet Union National League
 ......1991 to 1992......  CIS National League

Title holders 

 1923–24: Moscow
 1924–27: Not held
 1927–28: Moscow
 1928–33: Not held
 1933–34: Leningrad
 1934–35: Moscow
 1935–36: Leningrad
 1936–37: Dynamo Moscow
 1937–38: Burevestnik Leningrad
 1938–39: Lokomotiv Moscow
 1939–40: Burevestnik Leningrad
 1940–43: Not held
 1943–44: Armia
 1944–45: CDKA Moscow
 1945–46: Armia
 1946–47: Žalgiris
 1947–48: Dynamo Moscow
 1948–49: Tartu Ülikool
 1949–50: Dinamo Tbilisi
 1950–51: Žalgiris
 1951–52: VVS Moscow
 1952–53: Dinamo Tbilisi
 1953–54: Dinamo Tbilisi
 1954–55: Rīgas ASK
 1955–56: Latvian SSR Team
 1956–57: Rīgas ASK
 1957–58: Rīgas ASK 
 1958–59: Moscow
 1959–60: CSKA Moscow
 1960–61: CSKA Moscow 
 1961–62: CSKA Moscow
 1962–63: Russian SFSR Team
 1963–64: CSKA Moscow
 1964–65: CSKA Moscow
 1965–66: CSKA Moscow
 1966–67: Ukrainian SSR Team
 1967–68: Dinamo Tbilisi
 1968–69: CSKA Moscow
 1969–70: CSKA Moscow
 1970–71: CSKA Moscow 
 1971–72: CSKA Moscow
 1972–73: CSKA Moscow
 1973–74: CSKA Moscow
 1974–75: Spartak Leningrad 
 1975–76: CSKA Moscow
 1976–77: CSKA Moscow
 1977–78: CSKA Moscow
 1978–79: CSKA Moscow
 1979–80: CSKA Moscow
 1980–81: CSKA Moscow
 1981–82: CSKA Moscow
 1982–83: CSKA Moscow
 1983–84: CSKA Moscow
 1984–85: Žalgiris
 1985–86: Žalgiris
 1986–87: Žalgiris
 1987–88: CSKA Moscow
 1988–89: Stroitel
 1989–90: CSKA Moscow
 1990–91: Kalev
 1991–92: Spartak Saint Petersburg

Titles by club

Titles by Republic

Soviet basketball clubs in European and worldwide competitions

Historical players

 Armenak Alachachian
 Sergei Bazarevich
 Alexander Belostenny
 Alexander Belov
 Sergei Belov
 Stepas Butautas
 Valdemaras Chomičius
 Ivan Edeshko
 Stanislav Eremin
 Vasily Karasev
 Artūras Karnišovas
 Otar Korkia
 Yuri Korneev
 Jānis Krūmiņš
 Rimas Kurtinaitis
 Jaak Lipso
 Šarūnas Marčiulionis
 Anatoly Myshkin
 Modestas Paulauskas
 Aleksandr Petrov
 Arvydas Sabonis
 Tiit Sokk
 Sergei Tarakanov
 Vladimir Tkachenko
 Valdis Valters
 Gundars Vētra
 Alexander Volkov
 Alzhan Zharmukhamedov
 Viktor Zubkov

The lineups and rosters of the USSR League champions

1923–24: Team Moscow: Belyaev, A. Kovalev, S. Pashkov, V. Strepiheev, S. Chesnokov.

1927–28: Team Moscow: S. Vorobyov, A. Gusev, M.Medvedev, N. Strokin, K. Travin.

1933–34: Team Leningrad: F. Hostilius, Krasovskii, S. Kuznetsov, M. Morozov, P. Osipov, Vn. Rodionov, G. Tishinskiy.

1934–35: Team Moscow: E. Bokunyaev, V. Gorokhov, Zimin, A. Lobanov, M. Semichastny, J. Titov, K. Travin, A. Tolkachev.

1935–36: Team Leningrad: F. Hostilius, A. Elenskiy, Kuznetsov, V. Kurkov, M. Sverckov, G. Tishinskiy.

1936–37: Dynamo Moscow: V. Gorokhov, A. Grigoriev, V. Dmitriev, Alexander Zaitsev, A. Zinin, Rumyantsev, S. Spandaryan.

1937–38: Burevestnik Leningrad: B. Abramov, V. Zhebokritsky, B. Kondrashov, A. Selivanov, Stepanov.

1938–39: Lokomotiv Moscow: En. Alekseev, Belyaev, A. Lobanov, V. Kiselev, Romishevsky, Y. Titov, K. Travin.

1939–40: Burevestnik Leningrad: B. Abramov, V. Zhebokritsky, Zlobin, V. Kondrashov, V. Razzhivin, Rogov, A. Selivanov, Stepanov.

1943–44: Armia Tbilisi: N. Jorjkia, L. Dzekonsky, Ermakov, G. Zahlyan, B. Oganezov, B. Sarkisov, M. Filippov.

1944–45: CSKA Moscow: Ev. Alekseev, En. Alekseev, Bajkov, Grebenshchikov, V. Kudryashov, S. Kuznetsov, B. Mershin.

1945–46: Armia Tbilisi: G. Akhvlediani, A. Vachadze, G. Gupalov, L. Dzekonsky, N. Jorjikia, S. Oganezov, B. Sarkisov, O. Sulaberidze, M. Filippov.

1946–47: Žalgiris: S. Butautas, A. Vilimas, V. Dzenis, I. Kilšauskas, J. Lagunavičius, V. Majorovas, K. Petkevičius, V. Sercevičius, V. Kulakauskas.

1947–48: Dynamo Moscow: G. Bajkov, V. Vlasov, V. Kolpakov, A. Konev, Kogan, Y. Ozerov, Al. Saychuk, P. Sergeev, B. Fedotov, Yuri Ushakov.

1948–49: Tartu Ülikool: U. Kiivet, H. Krevald, I. Kull, V. Laats, I. Lysov, G. Rekker, H. Russak, E. Ehaveer, O.Õun, H. Kruus.

1949–50: Dinamo Tbilisi: D. Godziashvili, N. Jorjikia, V. Zhgenti, S. Tortladze, L. Intskirveli, S. Korkashvili, O. Korkia, A. Meskhi, J. Nizharadze, G. Rukhadze.

1950–51: Žalgiris: I. Balakauskas, G. Butautas, J. Lagunavičius, A. Nemcevičius, K. Petkevičius, Z. Sabulis, V. Sercevičius, L. Tendzegolskis, V. Timleris.

1951–52: VVS Moscow: Ev. Alekseev, En. Alekseev, V. Antonov, G. Gupalov, E. Kazakov, A. Konev, A. Moiseev, D. Osipov, G. Silins, S. Tarasov.

1952–53: Dinamo Tbilisi: G.K. Abashidze, G.A. Abashidze, V. Gvantseladze, N. Jorjikia, M. Eganov, V. Zhgenti, L. Intskirveli, A. Kiladze, O. Korkia, G. Minashvili, J. Nizharadze.

1953–54: Dinamo Tbilisi: G.K. Abashidze, G.A. Abashidze, M. Asitashvili, N. Jorjikia, V. Zhgenti, L. Intskirveli, M. Kvachantiradze, A. Kiladze, O. Korkia, G. Kutchava, J. Nizharadze.

1954–55: Rīgas ASK: M. Valdmanis, T. Gavars, A. Gulbis, T. Kalhert, J. Krumins, A. Leonchik, V. Muiznieks, G. Silins, V. Skalder, O. Hecht, L. Jankowski.

1955–56: Latvian Soviet Socialist Republic Team: M. Valdmanis, I. Veritis, J. Kalnins, T. Kalhert, R. Karnitis, J. Krumins, A. Leonchik, V. Muiznieks, G. Silins, O. Hecht, L. Jankowski.

1956–57; Rīgas ASK: M. Valdmanis, I. Veritis, A. Gulbis, J. Davids, T. Kalhert, J. Krumins, A. Leonchik, V. Muiznieks, Ostrouhs J., G. Silins, O. Hecht.

1957–58: Rīgas ASK: M. Valdmanis, I. Veritis, A. Gulbis, T. Kalhert, J. Krumins, A. Leonchik, V. Muiznieks, G. Muiznieks, G. Silins, O. Hecht.

1958–59: Team Moscow: A. Alachachan, A. Astakhov, N. Balabanov, Bochkarev, G. Volnov, V. Zubkov, Korneev Yu, Y. Ozerov, Semenov, M. Studenetsky, V. Torban.

1959–60: CSKA Moscow: A. Alachachan, A. Astakhov, A. Bochkarev, Volkov, V. Zubkov, Karpov, V. Kopylov, Semenov, P. Sirotinsky, A. Travin, V. Kharitonov.

1960–61: CSKA Moscow: A. Alachachan, A. Astakhov, Bochkarev, G. Volnov, Volkov, V. Zubkov, Karpov, V. Kopylov, Semenov, P. Sirotinsky, A. Travin, B . Kharitonov.

1961–62: CSKA Moscow: A. Alachachan, A. Astakhov, Bochkarev, G. Volnov, Volkov, V. Zubkov, Karpov, V. Kovalchuk, Y. Korneev, J. Lipso, Semenov, S . Sirotinsky, A. Travin.

1962–63: Russian Soviet Federative Socialist Republic Team: A. Alachachan, A. Astakhov, Bochkarev, G. Volnov, Volkov, V. Zubkov, Yu. Korneev, A. Kulkov, J. Lipso, Petrov, A. Travin, V. Hrynin, A. Shatalin.

1963–64: CSKA Moscow: A. Alachachan, A. Astakhov, A. Borodin, A. Bochkarev, G. Volnov, V. Zubkov, Yuri Korneev, A. Kulkov, J. Lipso, P. Sirotinsky, A. Travin.

1964–65: CSKA Moscow: A. Alachachan, A. Astakhov, A. Borodin, A. Bochkarev, I. Bryansk, G. Volnov, V. Zubkov, B. Kapranov, Y. Korneev, A. Kulkov, J. Lipso, A. Travin.

1965–66: CSKA Moscow: A. Alachachan, A. Astakhov, A. Borodin, A. Bochkarev, I. Bryansk, G. Volnov, V. Zubkov, B. Kapranov, A. Kovalev, Yuri Korneev, A. Kulkov, J. Lipso, V. Rodionov, A. Travin.

1966–67: Ukrainian Soviet Socialist Republic Team: V. Bryantsev, A. Valtin, B. Gladun, Novikov, V. Okipnyak, B. Pinchuk, A. Polivoda, L. Poplawski, W. Saluhin, N. Sushak, G. Chechurov.

1967–68: Dinamo Tbilisi: V. Altabaev, B. Bolqvadze, A. Kazandjian, Z. Karabak, M. Korkia, A. Lejava, Z. Leontiev, S. Magalashvili, R. Mamaladze, L. Moseshvili, V. Narimanidze, A. Skhiereli, V. Ugrekhelidze, T. Chikhladze.

1968–69: CSKA Moscow: Andreev, A. Astakhov, Belov, A. Blick, G. Volnov, V. Kapranov, N. Kovyrkin, N. Kryuchkov, A. Kulkov, J. Lipso, P. Nesterov, B. Selikhov, A. Sidyakin.

1969–70: CSKA Moscow: V. Andreev, S. Belov, A. Blick, N. Gilgner, A. Zharmukhamedov, V. Illyuk, V. Kapranov, N. Kovyrkin, N. Kryuchkov, A. Kulkov, V. Mercy, Ne. Selikhov, A. Sidyakin.

1970–71: CSKA Moscow: Andreev, Belov, N. Gilgner, I. Edeshko, A. Zharmukhamedov, V. Illyuk, V. Kapranov, Kovalenko, N. Kovyrkin, A. Kulkov, V. Mercy, C. Subbotin.

1971–72: CSKA Moscow: V. Andreev, S. Belov, I. Edeshko, A. Zharmukhamedov, V. Illyuk, V. Kapranov, Kovalenko, N. Kovyrkin, A. Kulkov, V. Miloserdov, V. Petrakov, C. Astrebov.

1972–73: CSKA Moscow: Andreev, Belov, N. Dyachenko, I. Edeshko, A. Zharmukhamedov, V. Illyuk, Kovalenko, N. Kovyrkin, A. Kulkov, V. Miloserdov, V. Petrakov, C. Astrebov.

1973–74. CSKA Moscow: V. Akimov, Belov, N. Dyachenko, I. Edeshko, A. Zharmukhamedov, V. Illyuk, Kovalenko, N. Kovyrkin, P. Lushenko, V. Miloserdov, V. Petrakov, C. Astrebov

1974–75: Spartak Leningrad: V. Arzamas, A. Belov, A. Bolshakov, L. Ivanov, S. Kuznetsov, A. Makeev, Y. Pavlov, M. Silantyev, V. Fedovrov, Yu. Shtukin, V. Yakovlev.

1975–76: CSKA Moscow: Mr. Avdeev, Belov, N. Dyachenko, I. Edeshko, S. Eremin, A. Zharmukhamedov, Kovalenko, S. Kovalenko, N. Kovyrkin, V. Miloserdov, V. Petrakov, C. Astrebov.

1976–77: CSKA Moscow: Belov, A. Gusev, I. Edeshko, S. Eremin, A. Zharmukhamedov, Kovalenko, S. Kovalenko, A. Lopatov, A. Meleshkin, V. Miloserdov, A. Mishkin, B. Petrakov.

1977–78: CSKA Moscow: V. Arzamas, Belov, A. Gusev, S. Eremin, A. Zharmukhamedov, Kovalenko, S. Kovalenko, A. Lopatov, A. Meleshkin, V. Miloserdov, A. Mishkin, B. Petrakov.

1978–79: CSKA Moscow: Belov, A. Gusev, I. Edeshko, S. Eremin, A. Zharmukhamedov, Kovalenko, S. Kovalenko, A. Lopatov, A. Meleshkin, V. Miloserdov, A. Mishkin, B. Petrakov.

1979–80: CSKA Moscow: Belov, A. Belostenny, S. Eremin, A. Zharmukhamedov, Kovalenko, S. Kovalenko, A. Lopatov, V. Miloserdov, A. Mishkin, Pankrashin, V. Petrakov, S. Tarakanov.

1980–81: CSKA Moscow: Gusev, S. Eremin, Kovalenko, S. Kovalenko, M. Kozhelyanko, V. Kuzmin, A. Lopatov, V. Miloserdov, A. Mishkin, Pankrashin, V. Petrakov, S. Tarakanov.

1981–82: CSKA Moscow: Gusev, S. Eremin, A. Kovtun, M. Kozhelyanko, V. Kuzmin, R. Kurtinaitis, A. Lopatov, A. Meleshkin, V. Miloserdov, A. Mishkin, Pankrashin, S. Tarakanov.

1982–83: CSKA Moscow: Gusev, S. Eremin, V. Kuzmin, A. Lopatov, A. Lyndin, A. Meleshkin, A. Mishkin, Pankrashin, Popov, D. Sukharev, S. Tarakanov, V. Tkachenko.

1983–84: CSKA Moscow: S. Bazarevich, A. Gusev, S. Eremin, A. Ermolinsky, A. Lopatov, A. Mishkin, Pankrashin, Popov, D. Sukharev, S. Tarakanov, V. Tkachenko, H. Enden.

1984–85: Žalgiris: M. Arlauskas, A. Brazys, A. Visockas, S. Jovaiša, G. Krapikas, R. Kurtinaitis, M. Lekarauskas, A. Sabonis, V. Chomičius, R. Čivilis, V. Jankauskas.

1985–86: Žalgiris: A. Brazys, A. Visockas, S. Jovaiša, G. Krapikas, R. Kurtinaitis, M. Lekarauskas, A. Sabonis, V. Chomičius, R. Čivilis, V. Jankauskas.

1986–87: Žalgiris: A. Brazys, A. Visockas, A. Venclovas, S. Jovaiša, G. Krapikas, R. Kurtinaitis, M. Lekarauskas, A. Sabonis, V. Chomičius, R. Čivilis, V. Jankauskas.

1987–88: CSKA Moscow: V. Berezhnoj, Volkov, V. Goborov, Gorin, A. Lopatov, I. Miglinieks, Minaev, Pankrashin, S. Popov, S. Tarakanov, V. Tkachenko, H. Enden.

1988–89: Stroitel: A. Belostenny, Volkov, E. Dolgov, A. Kovtun, Y. Kosenko, V. Levitsky, E. Murzin, S. Orehov, I. Pinchuk, A. Podkovyrov, Yu. Silvestrov, A. Shaptala, A. Shevchenko.

1989–90: CSKA Moscow: V. Berezhnoj, Gorin, A. Gusev, A. Kornev, S. Kocherin, A. Lopatov, A. Meleshkin, Minaev, S. Popov, G. Rezcov, S. Tarakanov, V. Tkachenko.

1990–91: Kalev: S. Babenko, G. Jackson, A. Karavaev, G. Kullamäe, A. Kuusmaa, M. Metstak, A. Nagel, M. Noormets, R. Pehka, I. Saksakulm, T. Sokk, A. Toomiste.

1991–92 (CIS League): Spartak Saint Petersburg: V. Gorin, V. Dolopchi, V. Karasev, J. Kisurin, A. Maltsev, M. Mikhailov, V. Mishnev, S. Panov, Z. Pashutin, A. Potapov, A. Fetisov, G. Schetinin.

See also
Russian Professional Championship
Russian Professional League
Russian Super League 1
Russian Cup
USSR Cup

References

External links

1923 establishments in the Soviet Union
1992 disestablishments in Russia
Basketball leagues in the Soviet Union
Defunct basketball leagues in Europe
Sports leagues established in 1923